Sierra de Alcubierre is a  long mountain range in the Monegros comarca, Aragon, Spain. It is located between the provinces of Zaragoza and Huesca.

Geography
This mountain chain crosses the arid eastern end of the Monegros comarca from northwest to southeast and divides the basins of the Gállego and Isuela rivers. It has numerous ravines and its landscape is characteristic of badlands.

The ridge's highest summits are Monte Oscuro (822 m) and San Caprasio (811 m); other summits are Corona de la Reina (629 m) and Vedao (548 m), located at the northern end of the range, as well as Sigena (592 m) and Huegas (447 m), located at the southern end.

This mountain range is named after the town of Alcubierre, located 3 km east of the range.
The Sierra de Alcubierre is divided into subranges, foremost of which are Sierra de Lanaja, named after Lanaja town, and Sierra de Pallaruelo, named after Pallaruelo de Monegros village, both located roughly in the central part of the main range.

See also
Monegros
Mountains of Aragon

References

External links 
 Official webpage of the Comarca of Los Monegros
 Tourism in Monegros
 Wikiloc - Perdiguera/Monte Oscuro
 Bike trails, Monte Oscuro - Alcubierre
 Chapter 4 Homage to Catalonia by George Orwell 1938

Alcubierre
Military history of Spain
Geography of the Province of Huesca